Octomeria chamaeleptotes is a species of orchid occurring from Brazil to Argentina (Misiones).

References

External links 

chamaeleptotes
Orchids of Argentina
Flora of Misiones Province
Orchids of Brazil